The Government Information Office, Executive Yuan (GIO) was a cabinet-level agency of the Executive Yuan of Taiwan (the Republic of China) in charge of promoting government policies and regulating domestic media.

History
In April 1947, the Republic of China government completed all preparations for the implementation of constitutional rule and made the transition from the stage of political suzerainty to that of constitutional government. All ministries, commissions and councils under the Executive Yuan were expanded, and on 23 April, the Executive Yuan created the Government Information Office and agencies for health, irrigation and land affairs. The GIO was formally inaugurated in Nanking on 2 May 1947, and the Department of International Publicity, originally under the Ministry of Information of the Kuomintang, was placed under it.

On 21 March 1949, then President Chiang Kai-shek promulgated the revision of Articles 3 and 5 of the Organic Law of the Executive Yuan, whereby the organisation of the Yuan was streamlined and all agencies were regrouped under eight ministries, two councils and one department. The GIO was dissolved, and the Executive Yuan Council approved at its 52nd session the establishment of an Information Department under the General Secretariat of the Executive Yuan on 5 April 1949. Twenty days later, the headquarters of the Information Department was transferred to Canton along with the central government.

Following the Chinese Civil War and further relocation of the central government to Taipei, Taiwan in December 1949, the Information Department was dissolved in March 1950. On 24 April, the Executive Yuan ordered the establishment of a temporary institution, the Office of Government Spokesman, which was responsible for making press releases.

The original GIO was reactivated on 1 January 1954, in response to changes at home and abroad. In August 1973, the GIO became responsible for matters pertaining to the mass media, originally carried out by the Ministries of the Interior and Education and other related institutions. In addition to its domestic and international information tasks, the GIO assumed responsibilities for publication affairs, motion picture affairs, as well as television and radio broadcasting.

The GIO was formally dissolved on May 20, 2012, with its International Information Department folding into the Ministry of Foreign Affairs and its Domestic Information Department falling under the direct jurisdiction of the Cabinet.

Taiwan Info
Taiwan Info is a French-language online daily that was published by the Government Information Office of the Republic of China until it got dissolved on May 20, 2012. It is now published by the Ministry of Foreign Affairs of the Republic of China. Its purpose is to keep French-speaking readers around the world informed of what takes place in the island-nation.

History of the site 
Taiwan Info was launched in April 2002 to replace Les Echos de la République de Chine, a printed bulletin that had been published every 1, 11 and 21 of the month since its establishment on October 20, 1968. It was finally transformed into an online daily to better reflect current situations of the country and to respond to increasing use of internet around the world.

Content of the site 
The site can be regarded as a window on Taiwan for French-speaking readers. In the 'La une' page, the headlines of 3 local newspapers, today's photo story together with 5 to 10 news are presented concisely everyday except weekends and public holidays. A variety of news are selected by the editors team to meet French speaking readers' interests. News releases are classified under 8 different topics : Politics (Politique), Cross-Straits Relations (Deux rives), Economic and Social Issues (Eco-Social), International, Society (Société), Science, Environment (Environnement) and Culture.

List of director-generals

Establishment in Nanking
 Hollington Tong 2 May 1947 – December 1948
 Shen Chang-huan December 1948 – January 1949

Relocation to Taipei
  January 1954 – February 1956
  February 1956 – July 1961
 James Shen July 1961 – November 1966
 James Wei November 1966 – June 1972
 Fredrick Chien June 1972 – May 1975
 Ting Mao-shih May 1975 – January 1979
 James Soong January 1979 – September 1984 (acting until June 1979)
 Chang King-yuh September 1984 – April 1987
  April 1987 – September 1991
 Jason Hu September 1991 – 10 June 1996
 Su Chi 10 June 1996 – 15 May 1997
 David Lee 15 May 1997 – 5 February 1998
 Chen Chien-jen 5 February 1998 – 30 November 1999
  30 November  1999 – 20 May 2000 
 Chung Chin (鍾琴) 20 May 2000 – 6 October 2000
 Su Cheng-ping (蘇正平) 6 October 2000 – 1 February 2002
  1 February 2002 – 1 July 2003
  1 July 2003 – 20 May 2004
 Lin Chia-lung 20 May 2004 – 13 March 2005
 Pasuya Yao 13 March 2005 – 25 January 2006
 Cheng Wen-tsan 25 January 2006 – 20 April 2007
 Yi Rong-zong (易榮宗) 20 April 2007 – 11 June 2007 (acting)
  11 June 2007 – 20 May 2008
 Vanessa Shih 20 May 2008 – 31 December 2008
  31 December 2008 – 24 December 2010
 Johnny Chiang 24 December 2010 – 1 May 2011
  1 May 2011 – 19 May 2012

See also
Censorship in the Republic of China
Propaganda in the Republic of China

References

External links
 
Taiwan GIO
Taiwan Review

Government agencies established in 1947
Executive Yuan
Ministries established in 1954
1947 establishments in China
2012 disestablishments in Taiwan
Propaganda in Taiwan